The Order of St. Mesrop Mashtots is awarded for significant achievements in economic development of Armenia, natural and social sciences, inventions, culture, education, healthcare, and public service, as well as for activities promoting scientific, technological, economic and cultural cooperation with foreign countries. The law on the St. Mesrop Mashtots Order has been in effect since July 26, 1993. It is named after Mesrop Mashtots.

Awards granted
Alexander Arutiunian
Edvard Mirzoyan
Svetlana Navasardyan
Silva Kaputikyan
Levon Aronian
Zori Balayan
Chris Bohjalian
Aram Chobanian
Grigor Gurzadyan
Rober Haddeciyan
Richard Hovannisian
Alain Juppé
Samvel Karapetyan
Sirvart Karamanuk
Yuri Khatchaturov
Dickran Kouymjian
Sergey Lavrov
Arthur Meschian
Vladimir Movsisyan
Arshak Petrosian
Rubina Peroomian
Vartan Sirmakes
Vahe Vahian
Alla Pugacheva
Rita Vorperian
Paul Guiragossian
Alexey Miller
Yuri Oganessian
Ardem Patapoutian - the first  Nobel Prize Laureate of Armenian origin

References

Orders, decorations, and medals of Armenia
Awards established in 1993
1993 establishments in Armenia